Naturally occurring iron (26Fe) consists of four stable isotopes: 5.845% of 54Fe (possibly radioactive with a half-life over  years), 91.754% of 56Fe, 2.119% of 57Fe and 0.286% of 58Fe. There are 24 known radioactive isotopes, the most stable of which are 60Fe (half-life 2.6 million years) and 55Fe (half-life 2.7 years).

Much of the past work on measuring the isotopic composition of Fe has centered on determining 60Fe variations due to processes accompanying nucleosynthesis (i.e., meteorite studies) and ore formation. In the last decade however, advances in mass spectrometry technology have allowed the detection and quantification of minute, naturally occurring variations in the ratios of the stable isotopes of iron. Much of this work has been driven by the Earth and planetary science communities, although applications to biological and industrial systems are beginning to emerge.

List of isotopes 

|-
| rowspan=2|45Fe
| rowspan=2 style="text-align:right" | 26
| rowspan=2 style="text-align:right" | 19
| rowspan=2|45.01458(24)#
| rowspan=2|1.89(49) ms
| β+ (30%)
| 45Mn
| rowspan=2|3/2+#
| rowspan=2|
| rowspan=2|
|-
| 2p (70%)
| 43Cr
|-
| rowspan=2|46Fe
| rowspan=2 style="text-align:right" | 26
| rowspan=2 style="text-align:right" | 20
| rowspan=2|46.00081(38)#
| rowspan=2|9(4) ms[12(+4-3) ms]
| β+ (>99.9%)
| 46Mn
| rowspan=2|0+
| rowspan=2|
| rowspan=2|
|-
| β+, p (<.1%)
| 45Cr
|-
| rowspan=2|47Fe
| rowspan=2 style="text-align:right" | 26
| rowspan=2 style="text-align:right" | 21
| rowspan=2|46.99289(28)#
| rowspan=2|21.8(7) ms
| β+ (>99.9%)
| 47Mn
| rowspan=2|7/2−#
| rowspan=2|
| rowspan=2|
|-
| β+, p (<.1%)
| 46Cr
|-
| rowspan=2|48Fe
| rowspan=2 style="text-align:right" | 26
| rowspan=2 style="text-align:right" | 22
| rowspan=2|47.98050(8)#
| rowspan=2|44(7) ms
| β+ (96.41%)
| 48Mn
| rowspan=2|0+
| rowspan=2|
| rowspan=2|
|-
| β+, p (3.59%)
| 47Cr
|-
| rowspan=2|49Fe
| rowspan=2 style="text-align:right" | 26
| rowspan=2 style="text-align:right" | 23
| rowspan=2|48.97361(16)#
| rowspan=2|70(3) ms
| β+, p (52%)
| 48Cr
| rowspan=2|(7/2−)
| rowspan=2|
| rowspan=2|
|-
| β+ (48%)
| 49Mn
|-
| rowspan=2|50Fe
| rowspan=2 style="text-align:right" | 26
| rowspan=2 style="text-align:right" | 24
| rowspan=2|49.96299(6)
| rowspan=2|155(11) ms
| β+ (>99.9%)
| 50Mn
| rowspan=2|0+
| rowspan=2|
| rowspan=2|
|-
| β+, p (<.1%)
| 49Cr
|-
| 51Fe
| style="text-align:right" | 26
| style="text-align:right" | 25
| 50.956820(16)
| 305(5) ms
| β+
| 51Mn
| 5/2−
|
|
|-
| 52Fe
| style="text-align:right" | 26
| style="text-align:right" | 26
| 51.948114(7)
| 8.275(8) h
| β+
| 52mMn
| 0+
|
|
|-
| style="text-indent:1em" | 52mFe
| colspan="3" style="text-indent:2em" | 6.81(13) MeV
| 45.9(6) s
| β+
| 52Mn
| (12+)#
|
|
|-
| 53Fe
| style="text-align:right" | 26
| style="text-align:right" | 27
| 52.9453079(19)
| 8.51(2) min
| β+
| 53Mn
| 7/2−
|
|
|-
| style="text-indent:1em" | 53mFe
| colspan="3" style="text-indent:2em" | 3040.4(3) keV
| 2.526(24) min
| IT
| 53Fe
| 19/2−
|
|
|-
| 54Fe
| style="text-align:right" | 26
| style="text-align:right" | 28
| 53.9396090(5)
| colspan=3 align=center|Observationally Stable
| 0+
| 0.05845(35)
| 0.05837–0.05861
|-
| style="text-indent:1em" | 54mFe
| colspan="3" style="text-indent:2em" | 6526.9(6) keV
| 364(7) ns
|
|
| 10+
|
|
|-
| 55Fe
| style="text-align:right" | 26
| style="text-align:right" | 29
| 54.9382934(7)
| 2.737(11) y
| EC
| 55Mn
| 3/2−
|
|
|-
| 56Fe
| style="text-align:right" | 26
| style="text-align:right" | 30
| 55.9349363(5)
| colspan=3 align=center|Stable
| 0+
| 0.91754(36)
| 0.91742–0.91760
|-
| 57Fe
| style="text-align:right" | 26
| style="text-align:right" | 31
| 56.9353928(5)
| colspan=3 align=center|Stable
| 1/2−
| 0.02119(10)
| 0.02116–0.02121
|-
| 58Fe
| style="text-align:right" | 26
| style="text-align:right" | 32
| 57.9332744(5)
| colspan=3 align=center|Stable
| 0+
| 0.00282(4)
| 0.00281–0.00282
|-
| 59Fe
| style="text-align:right" | 26
| style="text-align:right" | 33
| 58.9348755(8)
| 44.495(9) d
| β−
| 59Co
| 3/2−
|
|
|-
| 60Fe
| style="text-align:right" | 26
| style="text-align:right" | 34
| 59.934072(4)
| 2.6×106 y
| β−
| 60Co
| 0+
| trace
|
|-
| 61Fe
| style="text-align:right" | 26
| style="text-align:right" | 35
| 60.936745(21)
| 5.98(6) min
| β−
| 61Co
| 3/2−,5/2−
|
|
|-
| style="text-indent:1em" | 61mFe
| colspan="3" style="text-indent:2em" | 861(3) keV
| 250(10) ns
|
|
| 9/2+#
|
|
|-
| 62Fe
| style="text-align:right" | 26
| style="text-align:right" | 36
| 61.936767(16)
| 68(2) s
| β−
| 62Co
| 0+
|
|
|-
| 63Fe
| style="text-align:right" | 26
| style="text-align:right" | 37
| 62.94037(18)
| 6.1(6) s
| β−
| 63Co
| (5/2)−
|
|
|-
| 64Fe
| style="text-align:right" | 26
| style="text-align:right" | 38
| 63.9412(3)
| 2.0(2) s
| β−
| 64Co
| 0+
|
|
|-
| 65Fe
| style="text-align:right" | 26
| style="text-align:right" | 39
| 64.94538(26)
| 1.3(3) s
| β−
| 65Co
| 1/2−#
|
|
|-
| style="text-indent:1em" | 65mFe
| colspan="3" style="text-indent:2em" | 364(3) keV
| 430(130) ns
|
|
| (5/2−)
|
|
|-
| rowspan=2|66Fe
| rowspan=2 style="text-align:right" | 26
| rowspan=2 style="text-align:right" | 40
| rowspan=2|65.94678(32)
| rowspan=2|440(40) ms
| β− (>99.9%)
| 66Co
| rowspan=2|0+
| rowspan=2|
| rowspan=2|
|-
| β−, n (<.1%)
| 65Co
|-
| rowspan=2|67Fe
| rowspan=2 style="text-align:right" | 26
| rowspan=2 style="text-align:right" | 41
| rowspan=2|66.95095(45)
| rowspan=2|394(9) ms
| β− (>99.9%)
| 67Co
| rowspan=2|1/2−#
| rowspan=2|
| rowspan=2|
|-
| β−, n (<.1%)
| 66Co
|-
| style="text-indent:1em" | 67mFe
| colspan="3" style="text-indent:2em" | 367(3) keV
| 64(17) µs
|
|
| (5/2−)
|
|
|-
| rowspan=2|68Fe
| rowspan=2 style="text-align:right" | 26
| rowspan=2 style="text-align:right" | 42
| rowspan=2|67.95370(75)
| rowspan=2|187(6) ms
| β− (>99.9%)
| 68Co
| rowspan=2|0+
| rowspan=2|
| rowspan=2|
|-
| β−, n
| 67Co
|-
| rowspan=2|69Fe
| rowspan=2 style="text-align:right" | 26
| rowspan=2 style="text-align:right" | 43
| rowspan=2|68.95878(54)#
| rowspan=2|109(9) ms
| β− (>99.9%)
| 69Co
| rowspan=2|1/2−#
| rowspan=2|
| rowspan=2|
|-
| β−, n (<.1%)
| 68Co
|-
| 70Fe
| style="text-align:right" | 26
| style="text-align:right" | 44
| 69.96146(64)#
| 94(17) ms
|
|
| 0+
|
|
|-
| 71Fe
| style="text-align:right" | 26
| style="text-align:right" | 45
| 70.96672(86)#
| 30# ms[>300 ns]
|
|
| 7/2+#
|
|
|-
| 72Fe
| style="text-align:right" | 26
| style="text-align:right" | 46
| 71.96962(86)#
| 10# ms[>300 ns]
|
|
| 0+
|
|

 Atomic masses of the stable nuclides (54Fe, 56Fe, 57Fe, and 58Fe) are given by the AME2012 atomic mass evaluation. The one standard deviation errors are given in parentheses after the corresponding last digits.

Iron-54
54Fe is observationally stable, but theoretically can decay to 54Cr, with a half-life of more than  years via double electron capture (εε).

Iron-56

The isotope 56Fe is the isotope with the lowest mass per nucleon, 930.412 MeV/c2, though not the isotope with the highest nuclear binding energy per nucleon, which is nickel-62. However, because of the details of how nucleosynthesis works, 56Fe is a more common endpoint of fusion chains inside extremely massive stars and is therefore more common in the universe, relative to other metals, including 62Ni, 58Fe and 60Ni, all of which have a very high binding energy.

Iron-57 
The isotope 57Fe is widely used in Mössbauer spectroscopy and the related nuclear resonance vibrational spectroscopy due to the low natural variation in energy of the 14.4 keV nuclear transition. 
The transition was famously used to make the first definitive measurement of gravitational redshift, in the 1960 Pound-Rebka experiment.

Iron-58 
.

Iron-60 
Iron-60 is an iron isotope with a half-life of 2.6 million years, but was thought until 2009 to have a half-life of 1.5 million years. It undergoes beta decay to cobalt-60, which then decays with a half-life of about 5 years to stable nickel-60. Traces of iron-60 have been found in lunar samples.

In phases of the meteorites Semarkona and Chervony Kut, a correlation between the concentration of 60Ni, the granddaughter isotope of 60Fe, and the abundance of the stable iron isotopes could be found, which is evidence for the existence of 60Fe at the time of formation of the Solar System. Possibly the energy released by the decay of 60Fe contributed, together with the energy released by decay of the radionuclide 26Al, to the remelting and differentiation of asteroids after their formation 4.6 billion years ago. The abundance of 60Ni present in extraterrestrial material may also provide further insight into the origin of the Solar System and its early history.

Iron-60 found in fossilised bacteria in sea floor sediments suggest there was a supernova in the vicinity of the Solar System approximately 2 million years ago. Iron-60 is also found in sediments from 8 million years ago.

In 2019, researchers found interstellar 60Fe in Antarctica, which they relate to the Local Interstellar Cloud.

References 

Isotope masses from:

Isotopic compositions and standard atomic masses from:

Half-life, spin, and isomer data selected from:

Further reading

 
Iron
Iron